"A Love Like War" is a song by American rock band All Time Low for the reissue of their fifth studio album Don't Panic: It's Longer Now! (2013). Written and produced by the band's lead vocalist/guitarist Alex Gaskarth and Mike Green, and featuring the input of Pierce The Veil's lead vocalist Vic Fuentes, the song was released through Hopeless Records on September 2, 2013.

Music video
The music video for "A Love Like War" premiered on September 2, 2013. Directed by Drew Russ, the video features the band and Vic Fuentes in a movie theater watching a black and white film. The music video was nominated for Best Video at the Kerrang! Awards.

Chart performance
"A Love Like War" debuted and peaked at number 17 on the Billboard Hot Rock Songs chart, fueled by its peak positions of 15 and 12 on the Rock Digital Songs and Alternative Digital Songs component charts, respectively.

Certifications

References

2013 songs
All Time Low songs
2013 singles
Hopeless Records singles
Songs written by Jack Barakat
Songs written by Rian Dawson
Songs written by Alex Gaskarth
Songs written by Zack Merrick